The 27th Punjabis were an infantry regiment of the British Indian Army. It was raised in 1857, as the 19th Regiment of Punjab Infantry. It was designated as the 27th Punjabis in 1903 and became 3rd Battalion 15th Punjab Regiment in 1922. In 1947, it was allocated to the Pakistan Army, where it continues to exist as 11th Battalion The Punjab Regiment.

Early history
The regiment was raised during the upheaval of the Indian Mutiny, at Rawalpindi on 19 June 1857, as the Regiment of Rawalpindi. In 1860, it was sent to China to fight in the Second Anglo-China War. In 1861, the regiment was permitted to use the Royal Cypher within the Garter on its appointments for its meritorious services. During the Second Afghan War of 1878–80, as part of the Peshawar Valley Field Force, it advanced into the Khyber Pass to clear Afghan forces at Ali Masjid. In 1885, the regiment participated in the Third Burma War. In 1901, the 27th Punjab Infantry was dispatched to British Somaliland to suppress the resistance movement led by  Diiriye Guure of the Dervish State.

27th Punjabis
Subsequent to the reforms brought about in the Indian Army by Lord Kitchener in 1903, the regiment's designation was changed to 27th Punjabis.

During the First World War, the infantrymen served on the North West Frontier of India, Egypt, France and Mesopotamia. The regiment raised a second battalion in 1918, which was disbanded after the war.

Subsequent history
In 1921–22, a major reorganization was undertaken in the British Indian Army leading to the formation of large infantry groups of four to six battalions. Among these was the 15th Punjab Regiment, formed by grouping the 27th Punjabis with the 25th, 26th, 28th and 29th Punjabis. The battalion's new designation was 3rd Battalion 15th Punjab Regiment. During the Second World War, the battalion served in British Somaliland, Aden, Persia, Iraq, Syria and Italy. It was converted into a Machine-Gun Battalion in 1946. In 1947, the 15th Punjab Regiment was allocated to Pakistan Army. In 1956, it was merged with the 1st, 14th and 16th Punjab Regiments to form one large Punjab Regiment, and 3/15th Punjab was redesignated as 11 Punjab. During the Indo-Pakistani War of 1965, it was deployed in the Sylhet Sector of East Pakistan, while in 1971, it served in the Shakargarh Sector.

Genealogy

1857 Regiment of Rawalpindi
1857 19th Regiment of Punjab Infantry
1861 31st Regiment of Bengal Native Infantry
1861 27th Regiment of Bengal Native Infantry
1864 27th (Punjab) Regiment of Bengal Native Infantry
1885 27th (Punjab) Regiment of Bengal Infantry
1901 27th Punjab Infantry
1903 27th Punjabis
1918 1st Battalion 27th Punjabis
1922 3rd Battalion 15th Punjab Regiment
1956 11th Battalion The Punjab Regiment

References

Further reading
Rizvi, Brig SHA. (1984). Veteran Campaigners – A History of the Punjab Regiment 1759–1981. Lahore: Wajidalis.
Cardew, Lt FG. (1903). A Sketch of the Services of the Bengal Native Army to the Year 1895. Calcutta: Military Department.

See also
15th Punjab Regiment
Punjab Regiment

British Indian Army infantry regiments
Honourable East India Company regiments
Punjab Regiment (Pakistan)
Military units and formations established in 1857
1857 establishments in India